Asystasia mysorensis is an edible plant species in the family Acanthaceae found in Africa. It is used as a leafy vegetable and for animal fodder.

References

External links
PROTAbase on Asystasia mysorensis

mysorensis